Celebrity Deathmatch is an adult stop-motion claymated series created by Eric Fogel and produced by John Worth Lynn Jr. for MTV. A parody of sports entertainment programs, Celebrity Deathmatch depicted various celebrities engaging in highly stylized professional wrestling matches. The series was known for its large amount of gory violence, including combatants employing different abilities and weapons to deliver particularly brutal attacks, resulting in exaggerated physical injuries.

Two television pilots were broadcast on MTV on January 1 and 25, 1998. The series properly premiered on May 14, 1998, and ended on June 6, 2002, airing for 93 episodes. During its run, it was one of MTV's most popular cartoons alongside Beavis and Butt-Head and Daria. A series of German shorts, Celebrity Deathmatch Hits Germany, aired on June 21, 2001, but it was poorly received from the fans, which was rumored to be the source of the show's cancellation. For a brief period during that year, reruns of the series aired on broadcast network UPN. Early in 2003, a film based on the series was announced by MTV to be in production, but the project was canceled by the end of the year.

In 2005, MTV2 announced the revival of the show as part of their Sic 'Em Friday programming block. Originally set to return in November 2005, the premiere was pushed back to June 10, 2006 as part of a block with two other animated series, Where My Dogs At? and The Adventures of Chico and Guapo. The revival series was produced without any involvement from Fogel. While the first four seasons were animated by Fogelmania Productions and TakToon Enterprise, the series' fifth and sixth seasons were produced by Cuppa Coffee Studios, and the premiere drew over 2.5 million viewers, becoming MTV2's highest rated season premiere ever. It was canceled again in 2007.

In April 2015, MTV2 announced a reboot of the series. However, in November 2016, Fogel stated via Twitter that MTV did not pick up the pilot to the series. 

On December 6, 2018, MTV Studios announced a reimagining of the show was set to return in 2019 with Ice Cube as star and executive producer. However, no announcements, updates, nor new information have surfaced since the announcement and it has been speculated to have been quietly cancelled. As of 2023, the revival from 2006 is available to watch on Paramount+.

Episodes

Characters

Main characters
 Johnny Gomez (Maurice Schlafer, 1998–2002), (Jim Thornton, 2006-07): One of the two joint commentators on the Celebrity Deathmatches, Johnny is the more professional one, and a loyal friend of Nick's, despite his constant blunders. He only lost his professionalism once to Lenny Stanton, the producer's son and nearly lost it a second time concerning interviewer Tally Wong. Johnny's hair has noticeably changed from black to brown in the new season. Judging by a comment made by Tally during one episode, he may be wearing a hairpiece. Johnny harbors an intense hatred for her akin to Nick and Debbie, but tries to maintain being a professional. He was born in Illinois. Johnny would often end the episodes with his catchphrase "good fight, good night". Johnny bears a striking resemblance to Mike Adamle, a former professional football player and sports announcer, who was a host for the original American Gladiators.
 Nick Diamond (Len Maxwell, 1998–2002), (Chris Edgerly, 2006-07): Johnny Gomez's co-host, a perceived alcoholic and divorced father of one who is known to make on-air gaffes and errors, and will occasionally take his son to work. He harbors an intense hatred for interviewer Debbie Matenopoulos, and has also participated in, and won, several matches by himself. Nick is so hopeless that when he mentions having an uneventful weekend, Johnny spends the show preparing for the inevitable disaster to soon befall his co-commentator. He was born in Virginia. Nick bears a striking resemblance to Larry Csonka, an NFL legend who also commentated on American Gladiators.  
 Mills Lane (himself, 1998–2002), (Chris Edgerly, 2006-07): The official referee of the Deathmatch ring; he always starts matches by saying "Let's get it on!" and shows that this is one referee that cannot be knocked down with one hit. Another catchphrase is when there is a disputable move by either fighter, like using foreign objects, and he says "I'll allow it!" implying that just about anything is legal in the ring. Biting and guns are his only no-go moves by the fighters, and he prefers the ring to remain as clean as possible.. After he suffered a stroke in 2002, the real Mills stopped providing the voice of his own character but gave Edgerly his blessing.

Minor regular characters
 Stone Cold Steve Austin (himself): World Wrestling Entertainment (WWE) wrestler and guest commentator on Celebrity Deathmatch. Also the scientist, doctor and weapons expert on the show. He also fought and won a match against Vince McMahon (voiced by McMahon himself, and whom Austin would actually wrestle with on several WWE events in real life). Although he had a prominent role throughout seasons 1 to 4, Austin did not show up in the revival of the series, for Nick has once stated that he was too expensive to bring back.
 Stacey Cornbred (Leslie Shuman): The first interviewer on Celebrity Deathmatch, Stacey was more neutral and professional than Tally, Debbie and Marv. She remained until a sudden death from spontaneous human combustion. Though she had exploded, she briefly returned in a Halloween episode as a zombie to challenge Debbie in the ring only to be soundly (and messily) defeated.
 Debbie Matenopoulos (herself): The interviewer that succeeded Stacey Cornbred after her death. She hates Nick and does not prepare for any interviews, usually just asking whatever she feels like. Debbie often believes herself to be smarter than she really is, but her personality is self-centered and unprofessional. She left the show late in the 4th season on maternity leave. Debbie is similar to Tally in the way they act and behave during interviews.
 Tally Wong (Masasa Moyo): The new interviewer from Season 5 onward. Before most of the matches, she interviews the combatants in a segment called "Tally's Korner". Like Debbie, Tally is very self-centered and unprofessional. She usually spends most of her interviews insulting the celebrities rather than asking questions. The only time Tally does ask questions, she often asks whatever she feels like asking and when they refuse to answer, she makes rude remarks about them. At times, she makes rude remarks about Nick and Johnny during matches, earning her their ire, including making remarks about them wearing hairpieces. Whenever Nick or Johnny gets mad at her for it, she taunts them by daring them to "bring back Stacey Cornbred." Tally harbors an intense hatred toward Johnny Gomez, which proves to be mutual. Ironically though, this was the inverse in the previous show with Nick Diamond's loathing of Debbie.
 Marv Albert (Buck Lee): CDM's first guest commentator. He only appeared in the pilot episode and was best recognized for wasting the whole show watching the slow-motion replay of Pamela Anderson's implant-laden breasts jiggling repeatedly. Because of this, Johnny and Nick had Marv replaced with the more professional Stacey Cornbred until her untimely death.
 Phil the popcorn guy (John Worth Lynn, Jr) (Jim Conroy): A running gag; usually among the first victims in the audience when a Deathmatch gets too brutal to stay in the ring. Since his second season appearance, the vendor has been burned, chopped up, and even possessed by a demon at various points, only to come back again healthy in his next appearance.
 Nicky Diamond Jr., (Brendan Muller): Nick's son, who appeared in several episodes. In one episode he was possessed by a demon called "Captain Doody," but was delivered when The Undertaker executed a Tombstone Piledriver on the possessed Nicky during their bout, causing the demon to leave Nicky and enter the hapless popcorn salesman.
Potato Khan, (Mike Romano): One of the four super freaks and winner of the Big Freak Out tournament, Khan is a giant potato with human limbs featuring the DNA from Joe Pesci and Genghis Khan. He was accidentally created by Stone Cold when he dropped a French fry in the batch of celebrity DNA. After winning the tournament as several smaller versions of himself, Potato Khan is seen again (as whole) chained up as a prisoner in the basement of the deathmatch arena in season 4.

Temporary co-hosts
 Lenny Stanton: The producer's son with an intense knowledge of celebrities and was a temporary co-host. Johnny harbors an intense dislike for Lenny because of his obnoxious behavior and constant disrespect towards Nick, which proves to be mutual. He later paid the price for his disrespectful behavior, when a furious Nick rendered Lenny unconscious with a head butt. It was implied the laser pointing hooligan harassing Nick was Lenny trying to seek revenge against him and Johnny for his humiliation, but this was unconfirmed.
 Jack Nicholson: Temporary Co-host in "Nick in a Coma". He proved to be more professional and had a minor crush on Cindy Crawford. He lost his professionalism when he admitted he was annoyed with the fan girls being around Leonardo DiCaprio, Gerry Rosenthal, that led to an eventual match between them.
 Gilbert Gottfried: temporary interviewer and co-host. He is very professional, though at times selfish.
 Sam Donaldson: One of the producer's friends from ABC who harbored an intense hatred for Johnny and Nick for stealing the hosting position from him. He lied on the TV claiming the men were dead to avenge himself and take his rightful place as CDM's host. Sam later paid for his arrogance when Johnny and Nick returned to the hospital to fight him.
 Cousin Grimm: One of the four superfreaks Stone Cold Steve Austin created by splicing the genes of celebrities previously killed.  He is a mixture of Bill Clinton, Roseanne Barr, and Bigfoot. An obese hillbilly-esque man with shaggy black hair and overalls.  One of his hands is a nub-like hook, and he has a third leg growing from the outside of his thigh. Grimm's first fight pits him against the skateboarding Pierce McCrack.  The fight seems to end with McCrack as the victor, when he decapitates Grimm with a piercing-chain.  However, Grimm grows a new body, and while McCrack is showing off to the crowd, Grimm pulls out his spine (with skull still attached) and impales him with it, saying "Welcome back." In his second fight, Grimm does not survive.  He dices Potato Khan into tiny chunks that come alive.  He eats them, but cause him to smash his own head in.

Production

Celebrity Deathmatch started in 1997 on MTV's Cartoon Sushi as a short that featured convicted murderer Charles Manson and shock rocker Marilyn Manson fighting to the death. Deathmatch was brought back in 1998 for MTV's Super Bowl XXXII halftime special. Just three months later, Celebrity Deathmatch had entered MTV's main lineup. The show was popular enough for show creator Eric Fogel to be named one of the most creative people in the TV industry by Entertainment Weekly. CDM was not the first time Fogel made a show for MTV, as he also had a hand in creating The Head. also produced by John Worth Lynn, Jr.

During the next four seasons, Celebrity Deathmatch became more popular in other countries and gained viewers from all over the world, but four seasons and 75 episodes later in 2002, MTV decided to cancel the show.

Stephen Warbrick, one of the co-creators of Superjail! on Adult Swim, worked as a VFX colorist and graphic artist for the series.

Celebrity Deathmatch Hits Germany
From 2001 to 2002, Celebrity Deathmatch was met with a series of shorts titled Celebrity Deathmatch Hits Germany. In Celebrity Deathmatch Hits Germany, German celebrities would fight in a claymation style. Many of the celebrities were politicians or German musicians that were not well known to the general public.

Eric Fogel had no involvement with CDMHG, neither did TakToon Enterprise, as this was all handled by Andy Kaiser at the German stop-motion studio Studio Film Binder. While the show was broadcast on MTV in Germany, it was also shown on UPN in the United States. CDM Hits Germany was universally panned by critics, audiences, and the Celebrity Deathmatch fanbase, that it was cancelled in 2002 due to low ratings. It was often rumored to be the show that led to the cancellation of the original series.

Cancelled film adaptation
Due to its popularity, there were actual plans for a feature film adaptation of Celebrity Deathmatch launched in 2003. Eric Fogel was signed on to direct, write, and produce the film as his directorial debut film. But before production would begin, MTV cancelled plans for a movie due to not being as interested in animation as they used to be, along with fallout from the network's production of the Super Bowl XXXVIII halftime show where several supportive executives were forced out.

Music
MTV asked Marilyn Manson to compose a song for the show. Ultimately, the song conveyed the public's obsession with violence and sadistic acts which were portrayed on television. Manson believed that was the show's satirical take regarding society as a whole. "Astonishing Panorama of the Endtimes" became the only single off the Celebrity Deathmatch soundtrack. It was nominated in 2001 for the Best Metal Performance Grammy Award and later included on Manson's album The Last Tour on Earth.

Revival

New episodes of the show, which began production in 2005, were produced by Cuppa Coffee Studio as opposed to MTV's now-defunct animation department. The show featured an all-new voice cast and a new look. Johnny, Nick, and Mills Lane returned, albeit with new voices. Mills Lane, who used to be played by himself, was played by Chris Edgerly due to the real Mills Lane's 2002 stroke. Debbie Matenopoulos was replaced by Tally Wong. Eric Fogel chose not to get very involved with the new seasons due to his involvement on his show Starveillance for the E! network. The show was directed by Jack Fletcher and Dave "Canadian" Thomas. During the 2006 season, fans were able to vote on MTV2.com for future matches by choosing one of three matches and by sending a write-in request. However, due to the second cancellation of the show, these matches would not come to fruition. Fogel would later go on to create Glenn Martin, DDS, with Michael Eisner and Alex Berger, for Nickelodeon as part of Nick at Nite, and it performed poorly critically and financially.

Cancelled reboots
In April 2015, MTV2 announced a reboot of the show on its Twitter account. On November 2, 2016, Eric Fogel confirmed via Twitter that production on the reboot had been scrapped for unknown reasons and the pilot would not be going forward.

On December 6, 2018, MTV Studios announced yet another "reimagining" of the show was set to air in 2019 with Ice Cube as star and executive producer through his Cube Vision production company, with series creator Eric Fogel also as an executive producer, being unclear whether or not the weekly series would air on MTV, as the new version of the show was seeking "an exclusive [streaming video on demand] or premium broadcast partner." However, in an interview, executive producer Eric Fogel said: "I've had some conversations with Ice Cube. We're trying to put a plan in place. There's nothing I can announce officially. But there have been conversations." Despite that, no other new information, announcements nor updates have surfaced, and it has been rumored or speculated that the reboot is presumed to have been quietly cancelled with the re-merger of Viacom and CBS into Paramount Global and the shift of content production overall for the company to Paramount+.

Other media

Video game

A video game based on the series was released for the PlayStation, PlayStation 2, Xbox, and Microsoft Windows on October 14, 2003 by Gotham Games.

Syndication
Celebrity Deathmatch aired in reruns on UPN, and was re-aired on TNN (The National Network) (later Spike TV, now Paramount Network) from 2002 to 2003.

References

External links

 
 

 
1990s American adult animated television series
1990s American black comedy television series
1990s American parody television series
1998 American television series debuts
2000s American adult animated television series
2000s American black comedy television series
2000s American parody television series
2002 American television series endings
2006 American television series debuts
2007 American television series endings
2000s Canadian adult animated television series
2006 Canadian television series debuts
2007 Canadian television series endings
American adult animated comedy television series
American adult animated sports television series
American stop-motion adult animated television series
Canadian adult animated comedy television series
Canadian stop-motion adult animated television series
Clay animation television series
Crossover animated television series
Fiction about death games
English-language television shows
MTV cartoons
MTV2 original programming
American television series with live action and animation
Canadian television series with live action and animation
American professional wrestling television series
Television series by Cuppa Coffee Studios
Television series created by Eric Fogel
American television series revived after cancellation
Television shows adapted into video games
Cultural depictions of actors
Cultural depictions of sportspeople
Cultural depictions of pop musicians
Cultural depictions of rock musicians
Cultural depictions of politicians
Cultural depictions of presenters
Cultural depictions of religious leaders